{{Speciesbox
| image = Diodora gibberula 01.JPG
| image_caption =
| taxon = Diodora gibberula
| authority = (Lamarck, 1822) <ref>Lamarck ([J.-B. M.] de), 1815–1822: Histoire naturelle des animaux sans vertèbres', Paris [vol. 5: Paris, Deterville/Verdière] [vol. 6 published by the Author]; 7 vol. [I molluschi sono compresi nei vol. 5–7. Vol. 5 (Les Conchiferes): 612 pp. [25 luglio 1818]. Vol. 6 (1) (Suite): 343 pp. [1819]. Vol. 6 (2) (Suite): 232 pp. [1822]. Vol. 7: (Suite): 711 pp. 1822</ref>
| synonyms_ref = 
| synonyms =Diodora graeca auct.non Linnaeus, C., 1758Diodora menkeana auct.non Dunker, 1853Fissurella gibba Philippi 1836Fissurella gibberula Lamarck 1822 (original combination)Fissurella gibberula var. elongata Pallary 1900Fissurella gibberula var. major Pallary 1900Fissurella philippiana Dunker, 1846 
}}Diodora gibberula is a species of sea snail, a marine gastropod mollusk in the family Fissurellidae, the keyhole limpets.

Description
The size of the shell varies between 10 mm and 21 mm.

Distribution
This marine species occurs from France to West Africa and the Cape Verdes; in the Mediterranean Sea.

References

 Gofas, S.; Le Renard, J.; Bouchet, P. (2001). Mollusca, in: Costello, M.J. et al. (Ed.) (2001). European register of marine species: a check-list of the marine species in Europe and a bibliography of guides to their identification. Collection Patrimoines Naturels, 50: pp. 180–213
 Rolán E., 2005. Malacological Fauna From The Cape Verde Archipelago. Part 1, Polyplacophora and Gastropoda''.

External links
 

Fissurellidae
Gastropods described in 1822
Molluscs of Africa
Molluscs of the Atlantic Ocean
Molluscs of the Mediterranean Sea
Gastropods of Cape Verde